Bucculatrix alpina is a moth in the family Bucculatricidae. The species was first described by Heinrich Frey in 1870. It is found in southern France, Switzerland, Austria and Italy.

The wingspan is about 9 mm.

The larvae feed on Leucanthemum pallens and Staehelina dubia. They mine the leaves of their host plant. Larvae can be found in February and March.

References

Natural History Museum Lepidoptera generic names catalog

External links
 Images representing Bucculatrix alpina  at Consortium for the Barcode of Life

Bucculatricidae
Moths described in 1870
Taxa named by Heinrich Frey
Moths of Europe
Leaf miners